Argyrotaenia velutinana, the red-banded leafroller moth,  is a species of moth of the family Tortricidae. It is found in the eastern United States and south-eastern Canada, from Quebec and Ontario to Florida, west to Texas and at least Iowa. It has also been reported from British Columbia.

The forewings have a wide diagonal median band that is reddish in females and blackish in males. The basal area is light yellowish-brown with darker shading near the inner margin. The hindwings are dirty white to light grey with a pale fringe. Adults are on wing from February to October in two to four generations per year.

Neonatal larvae are not thought to naturally commit egg cannibalism. However Rock 1968 was able to induce it in laboratory conditions. They go on to feed on various plants, including the leaves and fruit of apple and other fruit trees, as well as spruce and various vegetables. The species overwinters in the pupal stage in folded leaves on the ground.

References

V
Moths of North America
Moths described in 1863